The Fairfield Barnett Space Coast Classic was a golf tournament on the Champions Tour from 1980 to 1990. It was played in Melbourne, Florida at the Suntree Country Club.

The purse for the 1990 tournament was US$300,000, with $45,000 going to the winner. The tournament was founded in 1980 as the Suntree Classic.

Winners
Fairfield Barnett Space Coast Classic
1990 Mike Hill
1989 Bob Charles

Fairfield Barnett Classic
1988 Miller Barber

Fairfield Barnett Senior Classic
1987 Dave Hill

Fairfield Barnett Classic
1986 Dale Douglass

Barnett Suntree Senior Classic
1985 Peter Thomson

Suntree Senior Classic
1984 Lee Elder

Suntree Classic
1983 Don January
1982 Miller Barber

Suntree Seniors Classic
1981 Miller Barber

Suntree Classic
1980 Charlie Sifford

Source:

References

Former PGA Tour Champions events
Golf in Florida
Recurring sporting events established in 1980
Recurring events disestablished in 1990